Zacks Place Sports Bar & Grill ("Zacks") was the first sports bar in Little Rock, Arkansas, launched in 1988.

History
Restaurant founders Alex Zacney & Rick Baranski report getting the idea for Zacks on a trip to New York in 1987 after being offered a beer by an attractive waitress while watching football. Zacks Place was the First Sports Bar opened in Little Rock in May 1988.

In 2015 Zacks Place was voted 13th in the Best of 2015 - Neighborhood Bar and was ranked 16th for Best Neighborhood Burger.

References

External links

Drinking establishments in Arkansas
Restaurants in Arkansas
Theme restaurants
Companies based in Little Rock, Arkansas
1988 establishments in Arkansas
Restaurants established in 1988